Leo Ford (born Leo John Hilgeford; July 5, 1957 – July 17, 1991) was an American pornographic actor who appeared in gay pornographic films and bisexual pornographic movies and magazines in the 1980s. He was born in Dayton, Ohio.

Career
In 1989, Ford was crowned King of the Beaux Arts Ball in New York City. His Queen was Melissa Slade.

Ford paired with David Alan Reis aka "Lance" in Leo & Lance and Blonds Do It Best, Leo and Lance directed by William Higgins; Blonds Do It Best directed by Richard Morgan. In his starring role for the film Games, directed by Steve Scott, Ford played a medal-winning swimmer in the Gay Games competition, with Al Parker playing a photographer assigned to take professional portraits of the athlete. In a scene that foreshadowed what happened to Ford in real life, his character had a severe motorcycle accident that left him hospitalized and in a coma.

Private life
Ford had a relationship with cult actor Divine. The two traveled together and he made appearances at clubs in which Divine was contracted to perform. After Divine's death, Ford began a relationship with Craig Markle. Ford and Markle lived together in Los Angeles and Hawaii and raised tropical birds. After Ford's death Markle ran a travel agency and oversaw Ford's collection of pictures from his career.

Death
On July 15th, 1991, while driving his motorcycle, Ford was struck by a truck making an illegal turn onto Sunset Boulevard. Ford suffered massive head trauma and died two days later on July 17th. Craig Markle was riding with him but suffered only minor injuries. Ford was cremated and his ashes sent to San Francisco, where after a wake at Josie's Bar they were scattered near the Golden Gate Bridge.

Selected videography

Gay
Best of Leo FordBlondes Do It Best (1986)Colossal Cocks 5Flashbacks (J. Brian) (1980)Games (1983)Leo & Lance (1983)New York City Pro (1982)A Night at AlfiesSailor in the Wild (1983)Sex in the Great Outdoors (1980–1984)Spokes (1983)Stiff Sentence (1986)Style (1982)William Higgins Class Reunion (1983)Summer Of Scott Noll  (1981)

BisexualBest Bi Far #1Passion by Fire: The Big Switch 2True Crimes of Passion''

See also

 List of pornographic movie studios
 List of male performers in gay porn films

Notes

External links

1957 births
1991 deaths
American male pornographic film actors
LGBT pornographic film actors
American LGBT actors
LGBT people from Ohio
Motorcycle road incident deaths
Male actors from Dayton, Ohio
Pornographic film actors from Ohio
Road incident deaths in California
20th-century American male actors
20th-century American LGBT people